Agarivorans litoreus is a Gram-negative, aerobic, rod-shaped, non-spore-forming and motile bacterium from the genus of Agarivorans which has been isolated from seawater from the Geoje Island in Korea.

References

Bacteria described in 2015
Alteromonadales